Tando Adam  is a city in Sindh, Pakistan.  It was formerly under Nawab Shah district (now known as Shaheed Benazir Abad District) until 1955 and later became part of Sanghar District. It is the 57th largest city in Pakistan,  Tando Adam was founded by Mir Adam Khan Mari, which is called "cantonment" for "Tando" in Balochi. Tando Adam is known for its industries and its agriculture; crops raised nearby include sugar-cane, wheat, cotton, bananas, and mangoes. It is the most populous city of Sanghar District with a population of  152,025 according to the 2017 census.

There is also new housing scheme expended the city towards. Like Satellite town, Lake city Tandoadam, Green city, hilltop and many others housing schemes expended the Tandoadam.

Overview
Tando Adam has number of ancient sites, including mosques and Hindu temples.
Now Tando Adam has a medical college namely;'Suleman Roshan  Medical College' at Hyderabad Road near Suleman Roshan Hospital and also has a water park at green city near Hyderabad road.both are created by senator Imamuddin Shouqeen ,

Economic activity
The town has many emerging and established industries with Ismail jee considered the trade hub of the district. Tando Adam has the biggest power loom industry in Pakistan. There is also a pharmaceutical industry known as AHSONS DRUG company also numerous fruit juice, paper products, cotton ginning and cottage industries also contribute to the national exchequer. Tando Adam is an economic center for Sanghar District. Its labour mostly came from Bangla road, Joharabad (formerly known as Jatia Para). There are more than 20 cotton ginning factories. The telecommunication industry also plays a vital role in the economic life of Tando Adam. Different oil extracting companies have set up in shahdadpur road and sanghar road of Tando Adam becoming a major source of employment for local people. It also attract many foreigners,  such as Chinese and Korean to work in these oil fields.

Cuisine
Tando Adam is full of bazaars, mosques, shrines and plenty of places to eat. Notable dishes of the city include sajji special dessert
barfi (known as "maawa"), Badayoon Peraa of Hafiz Sweets and lassi of Mastana are specialties known for their unique taste around the country.

Education
Tando Adam is home to many public and private educational institutions. Public institutions include New Ali Garh Government College, Government Girls Degree College, Sir Syed Government High School, Government Shah Abdul Latif High School and Government Fatimah Jinnah Girls High School. Private educational institutions include but not limited to Progenitor high school, Al-Saeed Islamic Public School, Sir Syed Children Academy High School, Sayara Khanum High School and The City Higher Secondary School, Zindagi Foundation School . The Educators, Smart School,The Noble Education system and Bahria Foundation School and college have also joined this league in the last years. The major business areas are linked with Muhammad Ali (M.A) Jinnah road. Muhammadi Chowk is the transit hub for proceeding to Hyderabad via the national highway and to Tando Allahyar.

Population
According to census of 2017 the population of Tando Adam Khan is 457,919. In 1951, there were only 21,260 residents; by 2012, the population had increased to 223,261. The area of the city is  it means Tando Adam Protruding Total 3,954 acre.
the population of Muslims is 93% Muslim, 6% Hindu, and 1% Christian.  While In Ethnicity 40% are Sindhi, 30% are Mohajir,12% are Brohi/Baloch, 10% are Punjabi, 4% are Pashtun, and 2% are Gujarati/Godhry Waly and 2% other ethnicity.  Urdu speaking people, Punjabi  & Gujarati/Godhry Waly arrived in the area following the 1947 partition of British India into India and Pakistan.  The official language of the city is Sindhi; other languages spoken include Urdu, Siraiki, Balochi, Brahvi Language,Pashto, Punjabi, Gujarati/Ghodhry Wali, and Marwari, Sindhi is a medium of communication.

References

 http://admissions.usindh.edu.pk/grad.html
 https://web.archive.org/web/20060217220529/http://www.statpak.gov.pk/depts/pco/statistics/other_tables/pop_by_mother_tongue.pdf

Populated places in Sindh